Computed radiography may refer to:
Photostimulable phosphor (PSP) plate-based radiography. This is the subject most commonly referred to by the term.
Computed tomography, using computer processing to generate 3D-images from multiple projectional radiographs
Digital radiography